John Carrington Brewster-Jones  (born 9 November 1949) is an Australian guitarist who has played in a number of Australian rock bands, including The Angels and The Party Boys. His father and grandfather Hooper Brewster-Jones were notable musicians.

Career

In 1970, Brewster, with his brother Rick Brewster and Doc Neeson, formed Moonshine Jug & String Band in Adelaide, the band evolved into The Keystone Angels in 1973. An appearance at the 1975 Sunbury Pop Festival, resulted in touring with AC/DC, and with Chuck Berry as his backing band. By the end of 1975 they become The Angels. Other members included Chris Bailey on bass guitar. Brewster left the band and joined The Party Boys in February 1986. He remained with The Party Boys until mid-1989, before teaming up with  his friend, Alan Lancaster to form The Bombers.  Brewster also performed on Jac Dalton's debut album From Both Sides.

He is still a member of The Angels and currently tours with the band which now includes his son, Sam Brewster on bass guitar.

Awards and nominations

Australian Songwriter's Hall of Fame
The Australian Songwriters Hall of Fame was established in 2004 to honour the lifetime achievements of some of Australia's greatest songwriters.

|-
| 2008
| himself
| Australian Songwriter's Hall of Fame
| 
|}

SA Music Hall of Fame
John was inducted into the SA Music Hall of Fame on 16 May 2014 alongside his brother Rick, Redgum's John Schumann and Rose Tattoo's Rockin' Rob Riley.

|-
| 2014
| himself
| SA Music Hall of Fame
| 
|}

References

General
  Note: Archived [on-line] copy has limited functionality.
  Note: [on-line] version established at White Room Electronic Publishing Pty Ltd in 2007 and was expanded from the 2002 edition.

Specific

External links
 The Angels
2015 John Brewster Interview - Australian Rock Show Podcast

Living people
The Angels (Australian band) members
The Party Boys members
Australian rock guitarists
Rhythm guitarists
Australian male singers
Australian songwriters
1949 births
Australian male guitarists